Ellesmere Port Dock is a dock in Britain, situated on the Manchester Ship Canal, in Ellesmere Port, Cheshire, England.

History
Ellesmere Canal is the name of the area were the canal joins the river Mersey; by the mid-1790s it was known as Ellesmere Port. Docks and warehouses were built to facilitate this.

Between 1830 and the 1840s facilities were improved by the engineer Thomas Telford and others. In 1846 the Ellesmere Canal was amalgamated with the Shropshire Union Canal.
 
In 1892 a new wharf was built to handle traffic on the Manchester Ship Canal.

In 1921 the docks were leased to the Manchester Ship Canal, and this led to the decline of Ellesmere Port.

20th Century
The site is now the National Waterways Museum, Ellesmere Port (formerly known as the Boat Museum).

21st Century
In 2007, as part of a revival of some industries, ports and shipbuilding in Britain, Ellesmere Port docks were re-opened. Plans for such development were expected to be submitted to the Local Authority during early 2009.

External links
MultiMap

Buildings and structures in Cheshire
Mersey docks
Ellesmere Canal
Shropshire Union Canal
Ports and harbours of Cheshire
Ellesmere Port